Servet Kocakaya (born 19 May 1973) is a Zaza–Kurdish singer-songwriter. He sings mostly in Turkish but also has songs in Kurdish and Zazaki.

Personal life
Servet Kocakaya was born in 1973 in the town of Solhan in the Bingöl Province. His mother was from Solhan while his father was from Diyarbakir. The family moved shortly to Antakya, Mersin and Cukurova. Later on he studied at the Hacettepe University in Ankara. In Ankara, he began his music career and Kocakaya released his first album, Keke in 1999.

Discography
Keke (1999)
Ki Zava (2001)
Duvar Şarkıları (2002)
Pencere (2005)
İki Dil Bir Heves (2011)

References

Living people
1973 births
People from Solhan, Bingöl
Turkish people of Kurdish descent
Zaza people
Kurdish male singers
Kurdish-language singers
Turkish-language singers